Len Jones (born ) is a British former child actor and voice actor of the 1960s and 70s.

In his youth, Jones appeared in television series such as Z-Cars (1964–68), Adam Adamant Lives! (1966), Dixon of Dock Green (1966–75), Softly, Softly (1967), The Magnificent Six and ½ (1968) and The Adventures of Black Beauty (1972). His film credits included appearances in Seventy Deadly Pills (1964), Sky West and Crooked (1966), Spring and Port Wine (1970), Straw Dogs (1971), Danny Jones (1972) and Made (1972).

He is notable for voicing the character of Joe McClaine in Gerry Anderson's Supermarionation television series Joe 90 (1968–69).

Filmography
 Seventy Deadly Pills (1964) - Phil Streaker
 Sky West and Crooked (1966) - Dusty
 The Christmas Tree (1966) - Boy In Bed in Hospital (uncredited)
 The Magnificent Six and ½: When Knights Were Bold (1968) - Steve
 Spring and Port Wine (1970) - Wilfred Crompton
 Straw Dogs (1971) - Bobby Hedden
 Danny Jones (1972) - Danny Jones
 Made (1972) - Barry

References

External links
 

1950s births
20th-century British male actors
British male child actors
British male film actors
British male television actors
British male voice actors
Living people
Year of birth missing (living people)
Place of birth missing (living people)